

Colleges

 College of Engineering, Vatakara (CAPE, Govt. of Kerala) 
 Govt College Madappally
 Govt college Nadapuram
 MES college Vatakara, Memunda
 MBA Centre Karimbanapalam NH, Vatakara
 Center For Computer Science and Information Technology, University of Calicut (Formerly MCA Centre Vatakara)
 Community College of IGNOU at Maniyoor

Schools

Cherapuram U P School, Theekuni 
Cherapuram New L P School, Kakkuni 
Velam H.S.S. Velam
Valayam U P School, Valayam 
govt:UPschool nadapuram (established in 1913)
Govt higher secondary school, Kallachi
Govt:up school Kallachi
Northnadapuram MLP school
Arakkilad east LP school
Muttungal South UP school (MSUP)-Chorode
Nallomkorol MLP School Ayancheri
Amrutha Public School, Vatakara
Amritha Vidyalaya, Vatakara
National H.S.S.Vattoli
Sanskrit H.S.Vattoli
Govt. U.P School, Vattoli
Govt. L.P School, Vattoli
Hi-Tech Public School, Vattoli 
Vyasa Vidya Peedom, Vattoli
National English Medium, Vattoli
Memunda Higher Secondary School, Memunda
Meppayil S B School, Vatakara
BEM High School, Vatakara
Govt.JNM higher Secondary School, Puthuppanam
Javahar Navodaya Vidyalaya, Vatakara, Palayad Nada (PO)
Government Technical High School, Vatakara.
Govt.higher secondary school, Vatakara, Puthoor (PO) (BTS)
Emjay V H S S Villiappalli, Villiappalli.
Katameri M.U.P School, Katameri
Kadathanad Rajas High School, Purameri
ChiraVattam LP School Memunda
Memunda East LP School 
RAC Higher Secondary School, Katameri
Rahmaniya High School, Ayancheri
Shanthi Niketan School, Thiruvalloor
Govt Higher Secondary School, Chorode
Vidya Prakash Public School, Thodannoor
Govt. Sanskrit Higher Secondary School, Meppayil
Sree Narayana English High School, Vatakara [English Medium]
 Rani Public School, Chorode, Vatakara (English medium)
Sree Gokulam Public School, kurikilad, Vatakara (English medium)
Islamic Academy English High School, Kottakkal
St. Anthony's Girls High School, Vatakara
MET Public School, Kallachi
Government Fisheries Higher Secondary School (boys & girls), Madappally
Manarul Ulum Madrassa High School, Thazhe Angadi
K.Kunhirama Kurup Memorial Government Higher Secondary School, Orkkatery
Maniyur Panchayath Higher Secondary School, Palayad Nada 
Govt. Higher Secondary School Orkkattery, Eramala.
Karakkadu L.P School Nadapuram Road
Athma Vidya Sangam L P School Madappally
Govt H.S Madappally
Mopila school LP Madappally
Avikkal Senior Basic School, Avikkal
Elayadam M.U.P School, Elayadam
Technical High School, Vatakara
shanthinikethan English School, Customs road, vatakara
M.U.M High School, Thazhe Angadi, Vatakara
ES school, Orkateri
Mopila School, Orkateri
Puthur J B school, Vatakara
Meppayil East J B school, vatakara
Meppayil East Senior Basic School (MESBS), Vatakara
IPC English Scholl, Payyoli & Maniyoor
Chettiyaath UP School, Puthuppanam
Ponniath mopla UP School, Keezhal
Onchiyam L P School, Vatakara
Onchiyam Government U P School, Vatakara
Arur U P School, Arur. established-1911
SGMSB school, Nut street Vatakara
Saraswathi Vilasam School, Arakkilad
Shivananda Vilasam J B School, Vatakara
Senior Basic School, Puthuppnam, Vatakara
Salafi public school nadapuram, Vatakara
Jr. Basic School, Pakkayil, Vatakara.
Kelappaji Memorial School.[English Medium].
Ideal Business school, Behind K.S.E.B, New Bus stand, Vatakara
Government higher secondary school Kallachi
Government higher secondary school Velliyodu
Crescent high school Vanimal
Eramala Central L.P. School Eramala
Eramala U.P. School Eramala
Vanimal Mappila UP School
Mandarathoor U.P.school, Mandarathoor
Mandarathoor M.L.P school, Mandarathoor
Chennamangalam L.P school, Chorode
Gayathri Vidhya Bavan, Vatakara
Harisree Vidhya Nikethan, Aravindhagosh, Puthuppanam, Vatakara
Fanar Indigenous School, Nut Street, Vatakara
 Model Technical Higher Secondary School, M.Y.M. Campus, Nadapuram
Bright School Valliad
St.Antony's Girls High School, Vatakara

Professional colleges

College of Engineering Vatakara, Vatakara
Modal Polytechnic College (IHRD) Vatakara, Vatakara

Tuition centres

Steps Entrance Coaching Centre
 TENSOR (Centre for Science & Technology Education), Vatakara  
MIDET
New Jyothi Arts and Science College
Institute of Calligraphy
ACE Vatakara, Edodi
Victory Vatakara Puduppanam
Acharya College Vatakara
Arabindo Institute Vatakara
Sciencentre
Indus College
RIMS College of Maths and science
Einstien Institute

Entrance coaching centres

 TENSOR (Centre for Science & Technology Education), Vatakara 
 Sciencecentrem Edodi, Vatakara
 RIMS College of Maths and Science, Edodi, Vatakara

Calligraphy

Institute of Calligraphy

References

Vatakara
Educational institutions
Vatakara area